Anthony Norman Rodd, known as Tony Rodd, (born 1940) is an Australian botanist.

Names published 
(incomplete list)
 Livistona fulva Rodd 1998. Revision of Livistona (Arecaceae) in Australia. Telopea 8(1): 103. 
 Livistona kimberleyana Rodd 1998. Revision of Livistona (Arecaceae) in Australia. Telopea 8(1): 121. 
 Livistona lanuginosa Rodd 1998. Revision of Livistona (Arecaceae) in Australia. Telopea 8(1): 82. 
 Livistona mariae F.Muell. subsp. occidentalis Rodd 1998. Revision of Livistona (Arecaceae) in Australia. Telopea 8(1): 81. 
 Livistona mariae F.Muell. subsp. rigida (Becc.) Rodd 1998. Revision of Livistona (Arecaceae) in Australia. Telopea 8(1): 80. 
 Livistona nitida Rodd 1998. Revision of Livistona (Arecaceae) in Australia. Telopea 8(1): 96. 
(These may not be accepted names.)

Publications 
(incomplete)
 Rodd, A.N. (1998)  Revision of Livistona (Arecaceae) in Australia. Telopea, 8(1): 49-153.
 Harden, G.J. & Rodd, A.N. (1990) Rubus. In 'Flora of New South Wales.' (Ed. GJ Harden.) Vol. 1 pp. 531–535. (Royal Botanic Gardens: Sydney)
 Rodd, A.N. & Pickard, J. (1983) Census of vascular flora of Lord Howe Island. Cunninghamia 1, 267-280.
 Rodd, A.N. (1974) Checklist of angiosperms. Environmental Survey of Lord Howe Island, 21-26.
 Rodd, A.N. (1982) Salicaceae. in 'Flora of Australia', 8, 200-206.
 Rodd, A.N. (1971) Australian palms. Australian Natural History, 25, 21-26.
 Bryant, K. & Rodd, A.N. (2005). The ultimate plant book. CSIRO Publishing.
 Rodd, A.N. (1996) The Ultimate Book of Trees & Shrubs for Australian Gardens. Random House Australia.
 Blombery, A.M. & Rodd, A.N. (1988) An Informative, practical guide to palms of the world: their cultivation, care and landscape use. Ed. Angus & Robertson. 201 pp.
 Mann, R. & Rodd, A.N. (1996) Ultimate Book of Trees and Shrubs. Ed. Random House Australia. 512 pp. 
 Cundall, P. & Rodd, A.N. (2006) Flora's gardening cards: perfect portable home reference for every gardener. Ed. ABC Books. 264 pp. 
 Rodd, A.N. (2006) Flora's Trees and Shrubs: Illustrated A-Z of Over 8500 Plants. Gardening Australia Series. Ed. ABC Books. 928 pp. 
 Rodd, A.N. (2007) Flora's Plantfinder: The Right Plants for Every Garden. Gardening Australia Series. Ed. ABC Books. 992 pp. 
 Rodd, A.N. & Stackhouse, J. (2008) Trees: The Macmillan Visual Guide. Ed. Pan Macmillan. 304 pp. ,

Translations of works

German

French
 Tony Rodd & Jennifer Stackhouse, (2009). Les arbres, Toulouse, Milan, DL. (304 p.)

Honours

Eponymous species
 (Araliaceae) Astrotricha roddii Makinson
 (Rubiaceae) Galium roddii Ehrend. & McGill.
(both names accepted)

References 

20th-century Australian botanists
Living people
1940 births
21st-century Australian botanists